The suboccipital nerve (first cervical dorsal ramus) is the dorsal primary ramus of the first cervical nerve (C1). It exits the spinal cord between the skull and the first cervical vertebra, the atlas.

It lies within the suboccipital triangle along with the vertebral artery, where the artery enters the foramen magnum.

It supplies muscles of the suboccipital triangle, the rectus capitis posterior major, obliquus capitis superior, and obliquus capitis inferior. The suboccipital nerve also innervates rectus capitis posterior minor.

See also
 Vertebral artery

Additional images

References 

Spinal nerves